Power of the Press is Angelic Upstarts's seventh album, released in 1986. The cover illustration was by Geoff Botham.

Track listing
All tracks composed by Thomas Mensforth and Brian Hayes; except where indicated

Side A
"I Stand Accused" (Mensforth, Derek Wade, Ray Cowie, Tony Morrison)
"Nottingham Slag"
"Joe Where Are You Now?" (Mensforth, Ronnie Rocker)
"Soldier" (Harvey Andrews)
"Empty Street"
Side A
"Power of the Press" (Mensforth, Ronnie Rocker)
"Stab in the Back"
"Here I Come"
"Thin Red Line" (Mensforth, Ronnie Rocker)
"I'd Kill Her for Sixpence"
"Greenfields of France" (Eric Bogle)

References

1986 albums
Angelic Upstarts albums